Serbia selected their Junior Eurovision entry for 2008 through a national final consisting of 12 songs. The winning song was selected by televoting and jury voting, which was Maja Mazić with "Uvek kad u nebo pogledam"..

National final 
The Serbian national final was held on 21 September, featuring 12 songs. The winning song was selected by televoting and jury voting. Neustrašivi učitelji stranih jezika and Nevena Božović, the Serbian JESC participants from 2006 and 2007, performed during the voting interval. Božović also performed a duet of "Oro" with Jelena Tomašević, the Serbian participant at the Eurovision Song Contest 2008.

At Junior Eurovision 
During the allocation draw on 14 October 2008, Serbia was drawn to perform 9th, following Bulgaria and preceding Malta. Serbia placed 12th, scoring 35 points.

Voting

Notes

References

External links 
 Official Serbian Junior Eurovision Site of 2008

2008
Serbia
Junior Eurovision Song Contest